is a Japanese voice actress. She started acting in 1990, and she has been affiliated with Kenyu Office since April 1, 2006, after leaving Arts Vision.

She has voiced Link and Aryll in The Legend of Zelda: The Wind Waker, Link in The Legend of Zelda: Four Swords Adventures and The Legend of Zelda: Phantom Hourglass, and Toon Link in Super Smash Bros. Brawl, Super Smash Bros. for Nintendo 3DS and Wii U, Hyrule Warriors and Super Smash Bros. Ultimate. In anime, she provided the voice of starring characters Naoto Yamada in A Penguin's Troubles, Sewashi  in Doraemon, and Takashi Horimachi in Taro the Space Alien, She also voices Haruka Kyoda in The Daichis, Hasumodai in Fantastic Children, Pike in Princess Tutu, and Yuuhi Shinatsuhiko in Yozakura Quartet.

Filmography

Anime

Film

Video games

Tokusatsu

References

External links
  
  
 
 

1973 births
Living people
Voice actresses from Kyoto Prefecture
Japanese video game actresses
Japanese voice actresses
20th-century Japanese actresses
21st-century Japanese actresses
Arts Vision voice actors